Miguel Navarro may refer to:

Miguel Navarro (swimmer) (born 1982), Bolivian swimmer
Miguel Angel Navarro (Argentine swimmer) (born 1941), Argentine swimmer
Miguel Navarro (runner) (born 1929), Spanish runner
Miguel Navarro (footballer)